KDEW-FM (97.3 FM, Country 97.3) is a radio station broadcasting a country music music format. Licensed to serve De Witt, Arkansas, United States, the station is currently owned by Arkansas County Broadcasters.

References

External links

DEW-FM
Country radio stations in the United States
Radio stations established in 1975